A kepenek is a thick, tent-like Turkish traditional shepherd's outer garment. It is a sleeveless, buttonless garment made of felt worn on the shoulders and covering the whole body from shoulders down. It is made of three parts: one for the back and two (the same as the back, cut in half along the length) for the front. The parts are stitched together along the shoulder lines and all the way down. Usually white, a kepenek may have some adornments.

A kepenek can be as much as one centimeter thick, and is sold according to weight; a kepenek weighs several kilograms. While worn as garment, they may also function as a  makeshift tent, allowing mobile sheperds to sleep in the open, in cold environments.

References

See also
Burka (Caucasus)

Turkish clothing
Coats (clothing)
Animal hair products